Epidauria subcostella is a species of snout moth in the genus Epidauria. It was described by George Hampson in 1918. It is found in Yunnan, China.

References

Moths described in 1918
Anerastiini